The 2020–21 season was the 23rd season in the existence of Dijon FCO and the club's fifth consecutive season in the top flight of French football. In addition to the domestic league, Dijon participated in this season's edition of the Coupe de France. The season covered the period from 1 July 2020 to 30 June 2021.

The head coach Stéphane Jobard was relieved of his duties after an eight-game winless run. He was replaced by David Linarès.

Players

First-team squad

Out on loan

Transfers

In

Out

Pre-season and friendlies

Competitions

Overall record

Ligue 1

League table

Results summary

Results by round

Matches
The league fixtures were announced on 9 July 2020.

Coupe de France

Statistics

Goalscorers

References

External links

Dijon FCO seasons
Dijon